Inari is a population centre in the municipality by the same name in Lapland, Finland. It is widely known as the capital of Finnish Sámi culture.

History

The village grew up along in a spot where the fast-flowing Juutua River empties into Lake Inari. As the centuries went by, the village developed into a robust and active market and trade centre. When the municipality of Inari was founded in 1876, the village became its centre.

The people living in Inari then were not, however, the first people to live in the village, as people had been living on the shores of Lake Inari for thousands of years before that. Several stone-age dwellings have been found in Vuopaja, on the edge of town near Siida, the Sámi Museum.

Gallery

See also
 Inari Sámi people
 Ivalo

References

External links

Villages in Finland
Villages in Inari, Finland
Populated lakeshore places in Finland